Below is a list of members of the 6th National Assembly of Namibia. They were selected by their parties based on the results of the 2014 parliamentary election. This National Assembly was inaugurated on 20 March 2015. Like each of the previous National Assemblies, it is led by the South West Africa People's Organization. The 6th National Assembly has 104 seats, up from 72 seats in all previous assemblies. 96 candidates were elected according to party lists and are assembled below in the order they appear on their party lists. President Hage Geingob appointed eight additional members after taking office.

South West Africa People's Organization
 Nangolo Mbumba
 Laura McLeod
 Pohamba Shifeta
 Agnes Kafula
 Sebastian Karupu
 Lucia Iipumbu
 Bernard Esau
 Priscilla Beukes
 Tjekero Tweya
 Lucia Witbooi
 Charles Namoloh
 Netumbo Ndaitwah
 Veikko Nekundi
 Johanna Kandjimi
 John Mutorwa
 Alexia Manombe-Ncube
 Alpheus ǃNaruseb
 Doreen Sioka
 Natangwe Iithete
 Sophia Shaningwa
 Tom Alweendo
 Juliet Kavetuna
 Calle Schlettwein
 Christine ǁHoebes
 Erastus Uutoni
 Sylvia Makgone
 Engel Nawatiseb
 Agnes Tjongarero
 Nickey Iyambo
 Anna Shiweda
 Asser Kapere
 Lidwina Shapwa
 Frans Kapofi
 Ndilipo Namupala
 Peter Katjavivi
 Maureen Hinda-Mbaziira
 Pieter van der Walt
 Aino Kapewangolo
 Hamunyera Hambyuka
 Saara Kuugongelwa-Amadhila
 Penda Ya Ndakolo
 Bernadette Jagger
 Erkki Nghimtina
 Lucia Nghaamwa
 James Sankwasa
 Kornelia Shilunga
 Sakeus Shanghala
 Anna Hipondoka
 Leon Jooste
 Priscilla Kavita
 Stanley Simataa
 Rebecca Iipinge
 Derek Klazen
 Sophia Swartz
 Usko Nghaamwa
 Itah Kandji-Murangi
 Immanuel Ngatjizeko
 Eveline Taeyele-Nawases
 Samuel Ankama
 Becky Ndjoze-Ojo
 Tommy Nambahu
 Annakletha Sikerete
 Royal ǀUiǀoǀoo
 Faustina Caley
 Alpheus Muheua
 Emilia Amupewa
 Daniel Kashikola
 Margaret Mahoto
 Billy Mwaningange
 Marina Kandumbu
 Utoni Nujoma
 Loide Kasingo
 Peya Mushelenga
 Norah Munsu
 Bernadus Swartbooi
 Ida Hoffman
 Leevi Katoma
 Selma Fillemon

Democratic Turnhalle Alliance (DTA)
 McHenry Venaani
 Jennifer van der Heever
 Vipuakuje Muharukua
 Elma Dienda
 Nico Smit

Rally for Democracy and Progress (RDP)
 Hidipo Hamutenya
 Steve Bezuidenhout
 Mike Kavekotora

All People's Party (APP)
 Ignatius Shixwameni
 Reinhold Nauyoma

National Unity Democratic Organisation (NUDO)
 Asser Mbai
 Meundju Jahanika

United Democratic Front (UDF)
 Apius ǃAuchab
 Dudu Murorua

Workers Revolutionary Party (WRP)
The WRP will send their second and third-placed candidate to the National Assembly.
 Benson Kaapala
 Salmon Fleermuys

Republic Party (RP)
 Henk Mudge

South West Africa National Union (SWANU)
 Usutuaije Maamberua

United People's Movement (UPM)
 Jan van Wyk

References

6th
2010s in Namibia